The Awakino River is a river of the Kaipara District in Northland Region. It flows , generally south from the Awakino Stream, which rises on the Tutāmoe Range, to reach the Wairoa River on the eastern edge of Dargaville. The river is crossed by SH14 and the mothballed Dargaville Branch railway.

The New Zealand Ministry for Culture and Heritage gives a translation of "Bad creek", which accords with a 1981 description of "a slow, meandering drain through willows, swamp and flax lands, with little interest" and lined with muddy stop banks.

See also 
 List of rivers of New Zealand

References 

Kaipara District
Rivers of New Zealand
Rivers of the Northland Region